The 1920 Chico State Wildcats football team represented Chico State Teachers College—now known as California State University, Chico—as an independent during the 1920 college football season. The 1920 Wildcats had no formal head coach for the first three games of the season. Luther Clements was head coach for the last three games. Chico State finished the season with a record of 3–3. The Wildcats were outscored by their opponents 95–117 for the season. They played home games at College Field in Chico, California.

Schedule

References

Chico State
Chico State Wildcats football seasons
Chico State Wildcats football